Combat Records was an American independent record label founded in 1983 and based in New York City. 

The label specifically was for heavy metal and punk rock acts, Notable artist include: Megadeth, Circle Jerks, Nuclear Assault, OZ, Death, Dead Brain Cells, Possessed, Crumbsuckers, Agnostic Front, Agent Steel, Dark Angel, Heathen, Zoetrope and Exodus. In 2017, it was announced that Combat was being relaunched by Megadeth bassist David Ellefson and Thom Hazaert as a new label imprint under their EMP Label Group.

History
Combat Records was the in-house heavy metal label for the independent powerhouse distributor Important Record Distributors. Important had several offices in the United States that promoted and sold Combat's releases. Important Records was also home to Megaforce Records in the mid-1980s and produced Metallica's Kill 'Em All and Ride the Lightning (prior to Metallica's transfer to Elektra Records), Anthrax's Fistful of Metal and many other early Megaforce releases.

In mid-1986, the Noise label signed a deal with Combat to distribute records in the US. Noise represented the bands Voivod, Celtic Frost, Helloween, Tankard, and Running Wild). Neat also signed with Combat, bringing Venom, Raven to the US, while Metal Blade brought Slayer and Trouble. Usually releases were issued in joint venture with the Combat logo.

The label signed thrash metal band Megadeth to a contract in November 1984. The band released Killing Is My Business... and Business Is Good!, their first album, in 1985. Capitol Records signed Megadeth in 1985, obtaining the rights from Combat to Peace Sells... but Who's Buying?, Megadeth's second album. The Combat logo appeared on the back of every Megadeth album on Capitol up through 1992's Countdown to Extinction. Megadeth's album Killing Is My Business... and Business Is Good! is one of the highest selling albums released by Combat Records with more than 200,000 copies sold.

The label had distribution deals with Music for Nations and Under One Flag for European releases of their catalog.

Purchase of the company
Combat Records was later taken over by Relativity Records. Owned by Sony Records, Relativity allowed Combat to exist for a brief period of time, before shutting it down. Later, Sony would discontinue Relativity Records as well. Sony Music Entertainment continues to retain rights to the majority of the label's catalog.

Rebirth
Combat Records briefly reformed in 2005, as an imprint under Koch Records, releasing records from Look What I Did, Horse the Band, and At All Cost.

Sony Music Entertainment released most of the original Combat catalog digitally for the first time in 2015. The releases were marketed through the relaunched Music For Nations label.

In 2017, it was announced that Megadeth bassist David Ellefson, with partner Thom Hazaert, was relaunching Combat as an imprint of EMP Label Group, who have released albums from Soulfly guitarist Marc Rizzo, Wrath, Dead By Wednesday, Hatchet, Sword, and more. On New Year's Day 2018, Ellefson announced that Throw the Goat was the first new band to be signed. In 2019, Ellefson and Hazaert's Combat Records, released joint venture reissues of several classic Combat catalog titles with Century Media Records, including releases by Exodus, Possessed, and Dark Angel.

Former artists

 Abattoir
 The Accüsed
 Agent Steel
 Agnostic Front
 Agony
 At All Cost
 Blind Illusion
 Carcass
 Charged G.B.H.
 C.I.A.
 Circle Jerks
 The Conduit
 Corrosion of Conformity
 Crumbsuckers
 Cyclone Temple
 D.B.C.
 Dark Angel
 Death
 Deathrow
 Devastation
 Entombed
 The Exploited
 Exodus
 Faith or Fear
 Forbidden
 Forced Entry
 Godflesh
 Have Mercy
 Heathen
 Helstar
 Impaler
 Look What I Did
 Ludichrist
 Megadeth
 Mercyful Fate
 Morbid Angel
 Murder in the First
 Murphy's Law
 Napalm Death
 Nuclear Assault
 Oz
 Possessed
 Powermad
 Raven
 Running Wild
 The Rods
 Thrasher
 TKO
 Tokyo Blade
 Savatage
 Steve Vai
 Sweet Pain
 Venom
 Virus
 Zoetrope

Videos
Combat formed a video label in 1985. It released one title, "Combat Tour Live: The Ultimate Revenge", later that year.

References

American independent record labels
Heavy metal record labels
Thrash metal record labels